Hemiphaga is the genus containing two large species of pigeons from New Zealand. 

There are two subspecies of New Zealand pigeon, Hemiphaga novaseelandiae: H. n. novaseelandiae of mainland New Zealand and the Norfolk pigeon (H. n. spadicea) of Norfolk Island, now extinct. The subspecies differed in their plumage colour and shape.

In 2001, it was proposed that a third subspecies, H. n. chathamensis or the Chatham Island pigeon, was distinct enough to be raised to full species status as H. chathamensis. This has since been accepted by most authorities.

Taxonomy
The genus Hemiphaga was introduced by the French naturalist Charles Lucien Bonaparte in 1854 with the New Zealand pigeon (Hemiphaga novaeseelandiae) as the type species. The name combines the Ancient Greek hēmi meaning "half-" or "small" with the end of the genus name Carpophaga introduced by Prideaux John Selby in 1835.

The genus contains two species:

References

Ptilinopinae
Taxa named by Charles Lucien Bonaparte